Pietsch is a German surname. It may refer to:

 Bill Pietsch (1935–2004), American politician am businessman
 Charles Francis Pietsch (1844–1920), American German-language newspaper publisher
 Coral Wong Pietsch (born ?), American brigadier general
 Gustav Pietsch (1893–1975), German captain, resistance fighter, and politician
 Hans Pietsch (Go player) (1968–2003), German Go player
 Hans Pietsch (1907-1967) German mathematician and cryptographer
 Janine Pietsch (born 1982), German Olympian backstroke swimmer
 Ludwig Pietsch (1824–1911), German painter, art critic, and writer
 Paul Pietsch (1911–2012), German racing driver and magazine publisher
 Sara Mohr-Pietsch (born 1980), British music broadcaster 
 Theodore Wells Pietsch I (1869–1930),  American architect
 Theodore Wells Pietsch II (1912–1993), American automobile stylist and industrial designer
 Theodore Wells Pietsch III (born 1945), American evolutionary biologist 
 Vonnie Pietsch (born 1936), American politician

Surnames from given names
German-language surnames